Renaud Connen (born March 21, 1980 in Melun) is a Monégasque former football midfielder.

External links

1980 births
Living people
French footballers
AS Monaco FC players
AC Ajaccio players
Grenoble Foot 38 players
Association football midfielders
Sportspeople from Melun
Footballers from Seine-et-Marne